is a 1933 German period drama film directed by Max Ophüls and starring Magda Schneider, Wolfgang Liebeneiner, and Luise Ullrich.

Production
The film, based on a play of the same name (Liebelei) by Arthur Schnitzler, describes an ill-fated love affair. A 1927 silent film version was previously produced. A separate French-language version – A Love Story (1934) – was also released, using most of the original cast.

The film's sets were designed by the art director Gabriel Pellon. Location shooting took place in Berlin and Vienna.

Plot
In Vienna during the late Imperial era, a love affair between a young lieutenant and a musician's daughter ends tragically when the lieutenant is killed in a duel, and the girl commits suicide.

Cast

Notes

References

Bibliography

External links

 "Senses of Cinema" essay by Jesús Cortés

1933 films
Films of the Weimar Republic
1930s German-language films
Films based on works by Arthur Schnitzler
German films based on plays
Films directed by Max Ophüls
1933 romantic drama films
Wiener Film
Films set in the 1890s
German multilingual films
1933 multilingual films
German romantic drama films
1930s German films